Christos Zoumis (born 1875 in Chalcis, Greece; date of death unknown) was a Greek athlete.  He competed at the 1896 Summer Olympics in Athens. He was born in Chalcis. Zoumis placed either sixth or seventh in the triple jump, with Fritz Hofmann having the other place. There were seven athletes in the event.

References

External links

1875 births
Year of death missing
Athletes (track and field) at the 1896 Summer Olympics
19th-century sportsmen
Greek male triple jumpers
Olympic athletes of Greece
Sportspeople from Chalcis
Date of birth different from Wikidata
Date of birth missing
Place of death missing